Cabinet pudding, also known as chancellor's pudding or Newcastle pudding, is a traditional English steamed, sweet, moulded pudding made from some combination of bread or sponge cake or similar ingredients in custard, cooked in a mould faced with decorative fruit pieces such as cherries or raisins, served with some form of sweet sauce. Other versions of cabinet pudding might use gelatin and whipped cream.

Early recipes

One of the earliest recorded recipes can be found in John Mollard's 1836 work The Art of Cookery New edition.

In literature
A reference appears in Benjamin Disraeli's first novel of 1826, Vivian Grey, where the title character teaches the Marquess of Carabas how to eat cabinet pudding with curacao sauce. 
In London Belongs to Me Mr Josser complains when his cabinet pudding is served with custard rather than white sauce. In From the Terrace by John O'Hara (1958), the protagonist Alfred Eaton is served cabinet pudding for dessert after being offered an important job at James D. MacHardie's firm.

See also
 List of steamed foods

References

External links

British puddings
English cuisine
Victorian cuisine
Steamed foods